Katarzyna Malgorzata "Kasia" Jaszczolt  (born 9 December 1963) is a Polish and British linguist and philosopher. She is currently Professor of Linguistics and Philosophy of Language at the University of Cambridge, and Professorial Fellow at Newnham College, Cambridge.

She is the author of a theory of discourse interpretation, default semantics. This theory breaks away from the tradition of modelling utterance meaning by means of a sentence-based proposition and proposes instead so-called 'merger representations' – conceptual representations which combine the output of various linguistic and non-linguistic sources of information leading to the recovery of speaker meaning, shifting compositionality from the level of syntactic structures to the level of the merger.

She has published widely on various topics in philosophy of language, semantics and pragmatics, including representing time in language and mind, ambiguity and underdetermination of meaning, propositional attitudes, and representing the self.

Education and career

Kasia Jaszczolt received her D.Phil. from the University of Oxford. Her academic career combines interests in meaning in natural language and in communication with interests in philosophy of language and mind, epistemology and metaphysics.

She took up the position of assistant lecturer at the University of Cambridge in 1995, followed by posts as Lecturer and Reader. Since 2010 she has been full Professor of Linguistics and Philosophy of Language at the University of Cambridge. Jaszczolt has been a Fellow of Newnham College since 1995.

As of 2018, she is general editor of a book series Oxford Studies of Time in Language and Thought, Oxford University Press and member of several editorial boards of linguistics journals, including Journal of Pragmatics, Intercultural Pragmatics and Belgian Journal of Linguistics, and book series, including Perspectives in Pragmatics, Philosophy and Psychology, Springer, and Studies in Pragmatics, Elsevier.

From 1996 to 2008 she was principal editor of a book series Current Research in the Semantics/Pragmatics Interface, Elsevier. She was also a member of the Committee of the Linguistics Association of Great Britain (LAGB).

Awards and honours

 Alumnus VIP, University of Łódź (2015)
 Elected member of Academia Europaea (2012)

Selected publications
 Meaning in Linguistic Interaction: Semantics, Metasemantics, Philosophy of Language. 2016. Oxford: Oxford University Press.
 Representing Time: An Essay on Temporality as Modality. 2009. Oxford: Oxford University Press.
 Default Semantics: Foundations of a Compositional Theory of Acts of Communication. 2005. Oxford: Oxford University Press.
 Semantics and Pragmatics: Meaning in Language and Discourse. 2002. London: Longman.
 Discourse, Beliefs and Intentions: Semantic Defaults and Propositional Attitude Ascription. 1999. Oxford: Elsevier Science.

References

External links
 Research profile on Newnham College website
 Kasia Jaszczolt's personal website
 Publications and talks (academia.edu)

Linguists from the United Kingdom
Women linguists
Linguists from Poland
Semanticists
Fellows of Newnham College, Cambridge
1963 births
Living people